Kshirachora Gopinatha Temple is in Remuna, Odisha, India. The name "Remuna" is from the word "Ramaniya" which means very good-looking. "Kshirachora" in Odia means Stealer of condensed Milk and Gopinatha means the Divine Consort of Gopis. The reference is to child Krishna's love for milk and milk products.

Vigrahas

Lord Gopinatha, flanked by Sri Govinda and Sri Madana Mohana, is made of black stone. Sri Gopinatha stands in bas-relief. Govinda and Madana Mohana, who were brought from Vrindavana in about 1938 by a devotee named "Chaitanya Dasa Babaji", are standing freely. It is said that Sri Rama carved Gopinatha with His arrow and that Sita worshiped this deity in Chitrakuta. During vanavasa to show the next avatara vigraha to Sita. King Langula Narasingha Deva, the king of Utkala, brought this deity to Remuna in the 13th century from Chitrakuta. This king arranged to have dug the two big tanks, Brajapokhari and Kutapokhari.

History
Over 500 years ago Madhavendra Puri was going to Puri to get some sandalwood for his Sri Gopal deity in Vrindavana. After a few days in Navadvipa, Sri Puri started for Odisha. Within a few days he arrived at Remuna where Gopinatha is situated. Seeing the beauty of the Deity, Madhavendra Puri was overwhelmed.

In the corridor of the temple, from which people generally viewed the Deity, Madhavendra Puri chanted and danced. Then he sat down there and asked a brahmana what kinds of foods they offered to the Deity. Madhavendra Puri thought: "I shall inquire from the priest what foods are offered to Gopinatha so that by making arrangements in our kitchen, we can also offer similar foods to Sri Gopala."

When the Brahman priest was questioned in this matter, he explained in detail the types of food that were offered to the Deity of Gopinatha. The brahmana priest said: "In the evening the Deity is offered sweet rice in twelve earthen pots. Because the taste is as good as nectar, it is named amrta keli. This sweet rice is celebrated throughout the world as gopinatha-ksheer. It is not offered anywhere else in the world."

While Madhavendra Puri was talking with the brahmana priest, the sweet rice was placed before the Deity as an offering. Seeing this Madhavendra Puri thought "If, without my asking, a little sweet rice is given to me, I could then taste it and make a similar preparation to offer my Lord Gopala." Then immediately Madhavendra Puri realised his mistake in desiring to taste the sweet rice, and he immediately repented, "I have committed an offence. I have desired to taste the preparation before it was offered to the Lord." Thinking in this way Puri Goswami left and went to a nearby vacant marketplace. Sitting there he began to chant.

After finishing the worship to Gopinatha the Pujari (priest) rested. In a dream Gopinath told him to get up and take the pot of khira that he had hidden under his garments and to give it to Madhavendra Puri. The Pujari got up, found the sweet, and brought it to Madhavendra Puri. The Pujari told him For you Sri Gopinatha has stolen kshira. There is no other fortunate man like you. This is how the deity got the name "Kshira Chora Gopinatha". 'Kshira' means condensed milk, and 'Chora' means thief.

Specialty
One can get delicious kshira here called as Amruta Keli. The Gopinatha kshira is a preparation of homemade condensed milk, sugar, and cream, with a sprinkling of raisins. It comes in pots, which are personally tasted by Lord Gopinatha.

Pilgrims 
Pilgrims from all over India visit all around the year. Local residents visit on every occasion and festivals. Western ISKCON devotees often visit the temple. The Founder Acharya of ISKCON A. C. Bhaktivedanta Swami Prabhupada established an ISKCON Center in Toronto, Canada, and named it "New Remuna Dham" - the presiding deity in temple is named Sri Radha Kshira Chora Gopinatha.

See also
Chaitanya Mahaprabhu
Krishna
Gopinath
Madhavendra Puri
Navagraha

References

the guideline
info about kshirachora temple
wikimapia
Kshirachora Gopinatha Temple

Hindu temples in Balasore district
Vishnu temples